Acanthostyles is a genus of flowering plants in the family Asteraceae described as a genus in 1971.

The entire genus is endemic to South America.

Species
 Acanthostyles buniifolius (Hook. ex Hook. & Arn.) R.M.King & H.Rob. - Rio Grande do Sul, Argentina, Bolivia, Paraguay, Uruguay
 Acanthostyles saucechicoensis (Hieron.) R.M.King & H.Rob. - Argentina

References

Eupatorieae
Flora of South America
Asteraceae genera